The Conservation Foundation, a registered charity in the UK, was founded on 5 March 1982 by Prof. David Bellamy and David Shreeve. Prof. Bellamy was the president of the Foundation. Dorothy Harris is now the Chair (2022), and David Shreeve is its executive director.

Structure
The charity is governed by a board of directors and supported by a council. Based in the Royal Geographical Society in Kensington, London, its current activities primarily cover the UK, but past projects have covered every continent on Earth.

Activities
The foundation runs a number of projects to engage the public in environmental issues. Most are aimed at communities around the UK, whilst others target specific regions of the UK or operate internationally.

Funding
The charity is supported through government funding, charitable trusts and foundations, individuals, and business sponsorship through corporate social responsibility projects. It is not a membership organisation.

External links
 The Conservation Foundation

Environmental charities based in the United Kingdom